Marcio Gomes Domingos (born 19 July 1978) is a Brazilian former footballer who most recently played for Toronto Lynx in the USL First Division.

Playing career
Gomes had stints with Atlético Clube Paranavaí and Club Sportivo Cerrito before going abroad to Canada to sign with the Toronto Lynx on July 21, 2004. He made his Lynx debut on July 25 in a 3-2 victory over the Calgary Mustangs. Under Duncan Wilde Brito was confined to the bench for most of the season, due to only appearing in matches for 45 minutes even when he started in the matches. Despite his efforts the Lynx failed to clinch a playoff spot, in total he appeared in 8 matches.

Honours
 2007: Paulista Vice Champion Paulista 2007

References

Living people
Brazilian footballers
Association football midfielders
Toronto Lynx players
USL First Division players
1978 births
Footballers from São Paulo